The surname Kovarski, Kovarsky, Kowarski, Kowarsky  (Russian-language feminine: Kovarskaya, Polish-language feminine: Kowarska) is typically associated with people of Jewish origin. It is a toponymic surname associated with one of the places named Kowary.  It may be either transliterated from Russian language (spelled with 'v') or from Polish (spelled with 'w').

The surname may refer to:

Felicjan Kowarski (1890–1948), Polish painter and sculptor
Lew Kowarski (1907–1979), French physicist
Alexander Kovarski
Simon Kovarski, birth name of Simon Kovar
Ori Kowarsky
Ryan and Dan Kowarsky
Kovarska, marriage name of Corinne Chochem (1905-1990), Jewish American choreographer and painter

See also
Kirk Karwoski, the surname mangled during emigration

References

Toponymic surnames
Jewish surnames